The men's Greco-Roman 84 kilograms at the 2004 Summer Olympics as part of the wrestling program were held at the Ano Liosia Olympic Hall, August 24 to August 25.

The competition held with an elimination system of three or four wrestlers in each pool, with the winners qualify for the quarterfinals, semifinals and final by way of direct elimination.

Pelle Svensson, a former two-time world champion (Greco-Roman 100 kg class) and member of board of FILA from 1990 to 2007, has described FILA as an inherently corrupt organization. During the 2004 Summer Olympics in Athens, Svensson served as chairman of the disciplinary committee of FILA. As he was watching the final in the men's Greco-Roman wrestling 84 kg class between Aleksey Mishin from Russia and Ara Abrahamian from Sweden, Svensson witnessed how the Russian team leader Mikhail Mamiashvili was giving signs to the referee. When Svensson approached him and informed him that this was not allowed according to the rules, Mamiashvili responded by saying: "you should know that this may lead to your death". Svensson later found proof that the Romanian referee was bribed (according to Svensson the referee had received over one million Swedish krona).

Schedule
All times are Eastern European Summer Time (UTC+03:00)

Results 
Legend
D — Disqualified
WO — Won by walkover

Elimination pools

Pool 1

Pool 2

Pool 3

Pool 4

Pool 5

Pool 6

Knockout round

Final standing

 Mohamed Abdelfatah was disqualified for unsportsmanlike conduct following his protest after the end of his quarterfinal.

References

Official Report

Greco-Roman 84 kg
Men's events at the 2004 Summer Olympics